In the Roman Rite of the Catholic Church, Lutheranism, Methodism and Anglicanism, an altar bell (also Mass bell, sacring bell, Sacryn bell, saints' bell, sance-bell, or sanctus bell) is typically a small hand-held bell or set of bells. The primary reason for the use of such bells is to create a “joyful noise to the Lord” as a way to give thanks for the miracle taking place atop the altar. 

An ancillary function of the bells is to focus the attention of those attending Mass that a supernatural event is taking place on the altar. These are kept on the credence table or some other convenient location within the chancel.

In the Catholic Church

At Mass

"A little before the Consecration, if appropriate, a minister rings a small bell as a signal to the faithful." The usual moment chosen for giving the signal of the approach of the Consecration is when the priest stretches out his hands over the host and the chalice while reciting the epiclesis. Mention of this signal was introduced into the Roman Missal in Pope John XXIII's 1962 revision. Even before 1962, it was common practice to give this signal, although it then "ha[d] no authority".

All pre-1970 editions of the Roman Missal, including that of 1962, prescribe continuous ringing of the altar bell while the priest recites the words of the Sanctus at Low Mass. but, in line with its abolition of a hard and fast distinction between a sung and merely spoken Mass, the 1970 edition makes no mention of that practice.

According to local custom, the server also rings the bell once or three times as the priest elevates the consecrated Host and then the Chalice Pre-1970 editions of the Roman Missal prescribe either a triple or a continuous ringing of the bell at each showing of the consecrated species. Pre-1962 editions also prescribe that the server should first light a elevation candle, to be extinguished only after the priest has consumed the Precious Blood or has given Communion to any others who wish to receive it.

On 10 September 1898, the Congregation of Sacred Rites declared inappropriate the use of a gong instead of the altar bell.

The ringing of an altar bell began probably in the 13th century. It is not mentioned in the original 1570 Roman Missal of Pope Pius V and was not introduced into papal Masses until the reign of Pope John Paul II.

Before the reintroduction of concelebration, priests frequently said Mass at side altars while a public celebration was taking place at the high altar, the Congregation of Sacred Rites found it necessary to prohibit ringing a bell at Masses celebrated at a side altar. The same rule was made even for a Solemn Mass celebrated at an altar other than one at which the Blessed Sacrament is publicly exposed, and allowed the ringing of the altar bell to be omitted when Mass was celebrated at the altar of exposition.

Like all church bells, the altar bell is not rung from the end of the Gloria in excelsis at the Mass of the Lord's Supper on Maundy Thursday until it is sung again at the Easter Vigil on Holy Saturday. During this holiest season of the liturgical year known as the Paschal Triduum, a wooden clapper known as a crotalus (crotalus/matraca; Latin: Crotalum, Crepitaculum) is sometimes used to make important sounds in place of the altar bell.

In some places it is local custom, not mandated by liturgical law, to also refrain from using altar bells during the seasons of Advent. As with Easter, they are rung again throughout the Gloria at Midnight Mass on Christmas Eve to celebrate the resumption of their use.

Benediction

Bells may also be rung during Eucharistic adoration and benediction of the Blessed Sacrament.

Lutheran
In branches of Lutheranism, altar bells are rung at the two appropriate times during the Words of Institution ("This is my body... This is the cup of my blood...") to signify the real presence.

Anglican

Some Anglican parishes, in particular those that are Anglo-Catholic, use an altar bell which is rung to signify the Real Presence of Christ in the sacred Elements.  During the Eucharist, it is usually rung three times - once before the Words of Institution, and once at each elevation of the Host and of the Chalice.  It may also be rung to indicate the time that the faithful may come forward to receive Communion when the priest drinks the wine from the chalice.

The bells are also rung when the monstrance or ciborium is exposed or processed, for example when moving the reserved Sacrament from a side altar to the high altar.  Custom differs concerning its use at Low Mass, or during Lent and Holy Week.

In some churches, particularly in the Anglo-Catholic tradition, a large (and sometimes decorated) gong, struck with a mallet, may be used during the celebration of mass as an alternative to the altar bell.

Methodist
In some Methodist churches, particularly the United Methodist Church of the United States, altar bells are used two different times during common services held on Sundays.  The Chimes of the Trinity are rung by an acolyte before the prelude of the service and at the end of the benediction.  The Chimes of the Trinity is the ringing of the bell three times to represent the Father, Son, and Holy Spirit.

References

Bells (percussion)
Church music
Eucharistic objects